Tavante Beckett (born October 21, 1997) is an American football linebacker for the Houston Roughnecks of the XFL. He played college football at Virginia Tech and Marshall.

College career
Beckett began his collegiate career at Virginia Tech. He was suspended indefinitely after his freshman season following an arrest for marijuana possession and ultimately transferred to Marshall University. Beckett was named the Conference USA Defensive Player of the Year in his redshirt senior season.

Professional career

Detroit Lions 
Beckett signed with the Detroit Lions as an undrafted free agent on May 3, 2021. He was waived on August 31, 2021, during final roster cuts and was re-signed to the practice squad the next day. Beckett was elevated to the active roster on December 5, 2021, for the team's Week 13 game against the Minnesota Vikings and made his NFL debut in the game. He signed a reserve/future contract with the Lions on January 10, 2022. He was waived on May 10, 2022.

Houston Roughnecks 
On November 17, 2022, Beckett was drafted by the Houston Roughnecks of the XFL.

References

External links
Marshall Thundering Herd bio
Detroit Lions bio

1997 births
Living people
American football linebackers
Detroit Lions players
Houston Roughnecks players
Marshall Thundering Herd football players
Players of American football from Virginia
Sportspeople from Chesapeake, Virginia
Virginia Tech Hokies football players